The Minister of Science and Technology is a Minister in the Cabinet of South Africa.

References

External links
Department of Science and Technology

Lists of political office-holders in South Africa